The Daily Iberian is a daily newspaper in New Iberia, Louisiana. The newspaper is owned by Wick Communications. It publishes editions on Wednesday, Friday and Sunday. As of 2010 the circulation is nearly 35,000. The Daily Iberian is a sister Wick Communications publication of Acadiana LifeStyle.

References

External links

Iberia Parish, Louisiana
Mass media in Baton Rouge, Louisiana
Newspapers published in New Orleans
Newspapers published in Louisiana
Publications established in 1893